Kosmos 2480 ( meaning Cosmos 2480) is a Russian Kobalt-M reconnaissance satellite  which was launched in 2012 by the Russian Aerospace Defence Forces. It was the last launch of a Soyuz-U rocket launched from Plesetsk Cosmodrome. 

Kosmos 2480 was launched from Site 16/2 at Plesetsk Cosmodrome. The last Soyuz-U carrier rocket launched from Plesetsk Cosmodrome was used to perform the launch, which took place at 18:05 UTC on 17 May 2012. The launch successfully placed the satellite into low Earth orbit. It subsequently received its Kosmos designation, and the international designator 2012-024A. The United States Space Command assigned it the Satellite Catalog Number 38335.

Kobalt-M
Kobalt-M satellites are a type of Yantar satellite, Yantar-4K2M. They have the GRAU index 11F695M. They are optical reconnaissance satellites which use film. The satellite sends two film capsules to earth and returns to earth itself at the end of its mission. This has the disadvantage that the satellite's life is dependent on how much film it can carry, and information from the satellite is not obtained until the film canister has returned to earth and been developed.

The satellite returned to Earth on 24 September 2012.

The previous satellite of this class, Kosmos 2472, was launched on 27 June 2011 and returned to Earth on 24 October 2011.

See also

List of Kosmos satellites (2251–2500)
List of R-7 launches (2010–2014)

External links
Photo set from the launch from Novosti Kosmonavtiki

References

Spacecraft launched in 2012
Spacecraft launched by Soyuz-U rockets
Kosmos satellites
Yantar (satellite)
Spacecraft which reentered in 2012